Adalberto Pereira dos Santos (11 April 1905 – 2 April 1984) was a Brazilian general and politician.

A veteran of the Brazilian Expeditionary Force during World War II, he served as the Army Chief of Staff during Costa e Silva's Presidency and then headed the Highest Military Tribunal.

He was born to Portuguese settler parents. His father emigrated from Ponte de Lima in Northern Portugal in 1898 and owned a cattle ranch. His mother's side of the family emigrated from the Azores.

Dos Santos served as the 18th vice president of Brazil under General Ernesto Geisel from 1974 to 1979. He was the last military Vice President of Brazil.

References

1905 births
1984 deaths
Vice presidents of Brazil
Brazilian generals
Military dictatorship in Brazil
Brazilian people of Portuguese descent

Candidates for Vice President of Brazil